The Saviour is a 2005 Australian short film directed by Peter Templeman. The film was nominated for the 2007 Academy Award for Best Live Action Short Film.

Awards

References

External links 
 

2005 films
2005 short films
2000s English-language films
Australian short films